Baile Glas or Ballaglasa is a settlement on Grimsay in the Outer Hebrides, Scotland. Ballaglasa is within the parish of North Uist.

References

External links

Canmore - North Uist, Grimsay, School and Schoolhouse site record
Canmore - Grimsay, Loch An Fhaing site record
Canmore - Baile Glas, Grimsay site record

Villages in the Outer Hebrides